The Grand Island Shrine, near Colusa, California, was built in 1883.  It has also been known as the Little Shrine at Sycamore.

It was listed on the National Register of Historic Places in 1974.  According to its NRHP nomination, it is significant as "a unique example of vernacular or folk architecture. The initial impact of suddenly sighting a small Gothic structure 100 yards off the highway in the middle of an open barley field lends to its uniqueness."  It was designed and built Father Michael Wallrath, who also hand kilned its bricks.  It is located on the site of the First Mass in Colusa County.

References 

Properties of religious function on the National Register of Historic Places in California
Gothic Revival architecture in California
Churches completed in 1883
Buildings and structures in Colusa County, California
National Register of Historic Places in Colusa County, California
Roman Catholic Diocese of Sacramento